Carlos Andrés Alvarado Quesada (born 14 January 1980) is a Costa Rican politician, writer, journalist, and political scientist who served as the 48th president of Costa Rica from 8 May 2018 to 8 May 2022. A member of the Citizens' Action Party (PAC), Alvarado was previously Minister of Labor and Social Security during the presidency of Luis Guillermo Solís.

Alvarado, who was 38 years old at the time of his presidential inauguration, became the youngest serving Costa Rican president since Alfredo González Flores who took office in 1914 at the age of 36.

Education
Alvarado holds a bachelor's degree in communications and a master's degree in political science from the University of Costa Rica. He was a Chevening Scholar from 2008 to 2009, earning a master's degree in development studies from the Institute of Development Studies at the University of Sussex in Falmer, England.

Personal life 
Alvarado was born in Pavas district, San José canton in central Costa Rica, on 14 January 1980, into a middle-class family. His father, Alejandro Alvarado Induni, was an engineer, and his mother, Adelia Quesada Alvarado, was a homemaker; he has an older brother named Federico and a younger sister named Irene.

Alvarado met his future wife, Claudia Dobles Camargo while riding the school bus that they both used to travel in, to go to elementary school. 

Alvarado is Roman Catholic.

Career

Literary career
In 2006, Alvarado Quesada published the anthology of stories Transcripciones Infieles with Perro Azul. That same year he obtained the Young Creation Award of Editorial Costa Rica with the novel La Historia de Cornelius Brown. In 2012 he published the historical novel Las Posesiones which portrays the dark historical period in Costa Rica during which the government confiscated the properties of Germans and Italians during World War II.

Early political career
He served as an advisor to the Citizen Action Party's group in the Legislative Assembly of Costa Rica in the 2006-2010 period. He was a consultant to the Institute of Development Studies of the United Kingdom in financing SMEs, Department Manager of Dish Care & Air Care (Procter & Gamble Latin America), Director of Communication for the presidential campaign of Luis Guillermo Solís, professor in the School of Sciences of Collective Communication of the University of Costa Rica and the School of Journalism Of the Universidad Latina de Costa Rica. During the Solís Rivera administration, he served as Minister of Human Development and Social Inclusion and Executive President of the Joint Social Welfare Institute, the institution charged with combating poverty and giving state aid to the population with scarce resources. After the resignation of Víctor Morales Mora as minister, Alvarado was appointed minister of Labor.

President of Costa Rica (2018–2022)

Same-sex marriage was a major issue in the campaign, after a ruling by the Inter-American Court of Human Rights required Costa Rica to recognize such unions. Alvarado Muñoz campaigned against same-sex marriage, while Alvarado Quesada argued to respect the court's ruling. On 1 April 2018, Alvarado won the presidential election (second round) with 61%, defeating Fabricio Alvarado Muñoz. He was sworn into office on 8 May 2018.

As president, Carlos Alvarado Quesada focused on decarbonizing Costa Rica's economy. He set a goal for the country to achieve zero net emissions by the year 2050. He planned to build an electric rail-based public transit system for the capital, San José since 40% of the country's greenhouse gas emissions come from transportation. On 24 February 2019, he launched a plan to fully decarbonize the country's economy, in a ceremony alongside Christiana Figueres, the Costa Rican former UNFCCC head. At this event, he described decarbonization as "the great challenge of our generation," and declared that "Costa Rica must be among the first countries to achieve it, if not the first."

He pushed through a law in December 2018, that included raising taxes and reducing the salaries of public sector employees, which he justified by the country's poor economic situation. His actions resulted in the largest general strike in twenty years.

During the COVID-19 pandemic, he decided to maintain a neoliberal economic policy with high social costs. The government has thus cut public spending, especially in the education budget. Unemployment has risen from 8.1% in 2017 to 14.4% by the end of 2021, 23% of the population lives below the poverty line and the public debt has reached 70% of GDP, one of the highest rates in Latin America. While this policy was supported in Congress by the National Liberation Party (PNL) and the Social Christian Unity Party (PUSC), the two main traditional parties, it has caused the government to lose the support of civil servants, academics, the left, and a large part of the middle class. According to ECLAC, Costa Rica is expected to be the Latin American country, along with Brazil, that will have the most difficulty in reviving its economy after the pandemic.

The country's political life has been marked by corruption cases, both in government and in opposition parties, which have contributed to the discrediting of the political class among a part of the population. Ministers, former ministers, and mayors have been implicated in corruption cases involving embezzlement and bribery for multi-million dollar public works contracts. In 2021, six mayors, including the mayor of the capital San José, were arrested. Some cases even revealed the penetration of political circles by drug trafficking groups.

At the end of Carlos Alvarado's presidential term, in one poll, he had a twelve percent approval rating. His successor, Rodrigo Chaves Robles, assumed office on 8 May 2022.

References

External links

Biography by CIDOB (in Spanish)

|-

|-

|-

|-

1980 births
Living people
Alumni of the University of Sussex
Costa Rican male writers
Government ministers of Costa Rica
People from San José, Costa Rica
Presidents of Costa Rica
Costa Rican Roman Catholics
Chevening Scholars